Michael Frank (1804–1894) was an American pioneer, newspaper editor, and politician.

Michael Frank may also refer to:
Michael Frank (music producer), the founder of the Earwig Music Company
Michael Sigismund Frank (1770–1847), Catholic artist and rediscoverer of the lost art of glass-painting
Michael C. Frank, developmental psychologist at Stanford University
Mike Frank, American Major League Baseball outfielder 
Michael Frank (film director), an Australian film director
Michael Frank, creator of the Museum of Bad Art

See also
Frank Michael (disambiguation)
Hans Michael Frank
Stephen Michael Frank
Michael Franks (disambiguation)